Go West is a 2005 Bosnian drama directed by Ahmed Imamović. It tells the story of two gay lovers, one being a Bosniak and the other a Serb, during the Bosnian War. It was developed jointly by two studios, one being in Bosnia and the other in Croatia.

Plot
Kenan (Mario Drmać), a Bosniak classical musician, and Milan (Tarik Filipović), a Serb, live in Sarajevo, Bosnia and Herzegovina in a clandestine gay relationship. When the Bosnian War breaks out in 1992, they try to escape from the city. In order to hide from Serbian militiamen, Kenan disguises himself as a woman and Milan passes him off as his wife. Together, they go to Milan's village in Eastern Bosnia, a Serb stronghold, where they continue to live in deception. However, Milan is soon conscripted into the army and Kenan is left behind in the village. Ranka, a woman from the village, discovers Kenan's secret and seduces him.

Cast
Tarik Filipović as Milan
Rade Šerbedžija as Ljubo
Mirjana Karanović as Ranka
Mario Drmać as Kenan
Haris Burina as Lunjo
Jeanne Moreau as Journalist
Nermin Tulić as Priest Nemanja
Almedin Leleta as Alen
Almir Kurt as Drago
Milan Pavlović as Milo
Orijana Kunčić as Posilna
Miraj Grbić as Serbian soldier

Reception
Go West was nominated for the Grand Prix des Amériques award at the Montréal World Film Festival, 2005. The film also won the audience award for the best film at the 2006 Bosnian-Herzegovinian Film Festival in New York.

The film received the prize for the Best Film at the Madrid Móstoles International Film Festival, 2007.

References

External links
 
 

2005 films
Bosnia and Herzegovina comedy-drama films
Bosnian-language films
2005 comedy-drama films
Bosnia and Herzegovina LGBT-related films
Serbian-language films
Bosnian War films
LGBT-related comedy-drama films
2005 LGBT-related films
Yugoslav Wars in fiction